Paandav is a 1995 Indian Hindi-language action drama film directed by Raj N. Sippy. It stars Akshay Kumar, Pankaj Dheer and Nandini in lead roles.

Plot
Inspector Vijay lives with his elder brother, Assistant Commissioner of Police, Ashwini Kumar; and sister-in-law, Jyoti, in an upper middle-class community in India. Assigned an investigation, which leads Vijay to conclude that the crime was committed by K.K. Kelva's man, he risks his life to arrest him, and hold him in prison until such time a date is fixed for a court hearing. Vijay also interrogates his prisoner, often using excessive force. Shortly thereafter, Vijay is instructed to release the prisoner - and the person who instructs him thus is no other than his very own brother, Ashwini, who it seems on the pay-roll of Kelva and his gangsters. What can Vijay possibly do to bring an end to this illicit relationship?

Cast

 Akshay Kumar as Inspector Vijay Kumar
 Nandini as Ritu
 Kanchan as Nisha Tiwari
 Pankaj Dheer as Hariya
 Mukesh Khanna as ACP Ashwini Kumar
 Kiran Kumar as K.K.Kelva
 Prithvi as Ajay
 Ajinkya Deo as Captain Sood
 Manjeet Kullar as Mrs. Jyoti Ashwini Kumar
 Sudhir Pandey as Commissioner J. K. Srivastav 
 Anil Nagrath as Home Minister Purshotam Sinha
 Aasif Sheikh

Soundtrack

References

External links
 

1995 films
1990s Hindi-language films
Films scored by Jatin–Lalit
Indian action films
1990s masala films
Films directed by Raj N. Sippy